B. Paul Thaliath is an Indian radiation oncologist from the South Indian state of Kerala. He is the additional director of the Regional Cancer Centre and the Head of the Department of Radiation Oncology at Kamla Nehru Memorial Hospital, Prayagraj. He is known to be involved with several cancer awareness programs and has been a part of the Cancer and Women programme in connection with the National Cancer Awareness Day of 2006. Thaliath was honored by the Government of India, in 2007, with the fourth highest Indian civilian award of Padma Shri.

See also
 Oncology

References

External links

Recipients of the Padma Shri in medicine
Malayali people
Medical doctors from Kerala
Indian oncologists
1952 births
Living people
20th-century Indian medical doctors